Life as We Know It is a 2010 American romantic comedy film directed by Greg Berlanti, starring Katherine Heigl and Josh Duhamel. It was released on October 8, 2010, after sneak previews in 811 theaters on October 2, 2010.

Plot 
Holly Berenson is the owner of a small Atlanta bakery, and Eric Messer is a promising television technical sports director for the Atlanta Hawks. Their best friends, Peter and Alison, set them up on a blind date, that goes horribly wrong, and results in both hating each other with a passion. As the years go by, Peter and Alison get married, have a baby girl named Sophie, and select Holly and Ericwho teasingly tolerate each otheras the godparents.

Shortly after Sophie's first birthday, Peter and Alison are killed in a car crash. Holly and Eric learn that their friends named them Sophie's joint guardians. After finding that none of Peter and Alison's relatives are fit to take care of Sophie, Holly and Eric put their differences aside and move into Sophie's home.

Living together proves to be a struggle. One night, Holly is away at an important catering job when Eric is given the opportunity to direct a big basketball game. Eric takes Sophie with him, but her crying distracts him, leading to him making a big mistake on the broadcast. When they get home, Eric and Holly argue, but later they make up.

Holly goes on a date with Sam, Sophie's pediatrician. The date is cut short when Eric calls to tell Sam that Sophie has a high fever. When they join him at the hospital, Eric sees Holly kiss Sam.

Over time, the guardians discover that raising a child is more expensive than they had expected, and Holly, can no longer afford to expand her business. Eric helps by investing in her company, and they cement the new relationship by going on a date, which ends with them having sex, while developing strong feelings.

Their Child Protective Services caseworker, Janine, tells them they must make a firm commitment, either to stay together, or break up, as waffling in between would be bad for Sophie. Eric is offered his dream job with the Phoenix Suns, and doesn't discuss it with Holly. When she finds out, she tells him to take the job, accusing him of looking for a way out of raising Sophie.

At Thanksgiving break, Eric returns from Phoenix for a visit, hoping to patch things up with Holly. She invites him to a dinner that she and Sam are hosting for neighbors and friends. Eric and Holly argue when he learns she is planning to sell the house soon, as the upkeep is too costly. Holly accuses Eric of deserting her and Sophie, while Eric points out how quickly she replaced him. Eric tells her he loves her, but leaves the dinner, planning to return to Phoenix. Once alone with Holly, Sam says that if he and his former wife had fought in the way that Eric and Holly did, they would still be together. He tells Holly to work out her feelings for Eric, and leaves. That night, Sophie calls Holly "Mama" for the first time.

Janine visits to make her final determination whether Holly and Eric are fit parents. Holly realizes that she can't take care of Sophie without Eric, and that she loves him. She, Sophie and Janine rush to the airport, but on reaching the gate, finds that Eric's flight has departed. She returns to the house, where she finds him sitting inside. He tells her he has realized, that Peter and Alison chose them to be Sophie's guardians because, together, they are a loving family.

A few months later, they host Sophie's second birthday party, with all the neighbors and friends in attendance. Holly has made a second cake, with the number 1 on it, telling Eric "It's for us, 'cause we made it a year." They kiss, then the guests sing 'Happy Birthday' to Sophie.

Cast

 Katherine Heigl as Holly Berenson
 Josh Duhamel as Eric Messer
 Josh Lucas as Sam
 Christina Hendricks as Alison Novak
 Hayes MacArthur as Peter Novak
 DeRay Davis as Lonnie
 Sarah Burns as Janine Groff
 Rob Huebel as Ted
 Bill Brochtrup as Gary
 Andy Buckley as George Dunn
 Andrew Daly as Scott
 Majandra Delfino as Jenna
 Reggie Lee as Alan Burke
 Melissa McCarthy as DeeDee
 Will Sasso as Josh
 Jessica St. Clair as Beth
 Kumail Nanjiani as Simon
 Alexis, Brynn, and Brooke Clagett as Sophie Christina Novak (The Baby)
Jean Smart as Mrs. Berenson (uncredited)

Production
Filming took place on location, in a house in the wealthy Buckhead area of Atlanta. Holly Berenson's bakery was depicted at Belly General Store in Virginia-Highland, a century-old bungalow-style neighborhood with several small-scale historic retail clusters, a few miles northeast of Downtown Atlanta. Scenes from Eric's workplace were filmed at Turner Broadcasting System (TBS) off Techwood Drive in Atlanta. Filming also took place at Philips Arena.

Reception
On Rotten Tomatoes, the film has an approval rating of 29% based on 153 reviews and an average rating of 4.60/10. The critics consensus reads: "Katherine Heigl and Josh Duhamel make a charming couple with plenty of chemistry, but that isn't enough to make up for Life as We Know Its formulaic plot and poorly written script." On Metacritic, the film has a score of 39 out of 100 based on 31 critic reviews, meaning "generally unfavorable reviews". Audiences polled by CinemaScore gave the film an average grade of "A−" on an A+ to F scale.

Release
Despite having been a critical failure, Life as We Know It had a successful run at the box office, bringing in over $105 million worldwide against a $38 million budget.

References

External links
 
 
 
 
 
 
 Life as We Know It at The Numbers

2010 films
2010 romantic comedy-drama films
American romantic comedy-drama films
Films about dysfunctional families
Films directed by Greg Berlanti
Films scored by Blake Neely
Films set in Atlanta
Films shot in Atlanta
Village Roadshow Pictures films
Gold Circle Films films
Warner Bros. films
2010 comedy films
2010 drama films
Atlanta Hawks
Films about parenting
2010s English-language films
2010s American films